Coração d'Ouro (Heart of Gold) is a Portuguese telenovela that aired on SIC from 7 September 2015 to 24 September 2016.

Plot
Maria's painful challenge starts when Antonio, her former employer, facing death, decides to make justice for the past and includes her on his will. 
His goal is to, somehow, make it up to her and ensure that Maria and her daughter, Catarina, won't have to struggle anymore as he knows the terrible truth: Catarina is Antonio's granddaughter. Maria had a relationship with Antonio's son, Henrique. 
What could be a promising start of happiness turns into a nightmare once Catarina, knowing about the will, decides to kill Antonio, without knowing he is actually her grandfather. Maria find's it out and has to choose between justice and her daughter.
Once inheriting shares from a Douro river farm, that produces an international awarded Oporto wine and shares from a medical clinic pioneer in the immunology research, Maria has to face the firm resistance from Henrique, which believes they're both opportunists that misled his father. He will start a war and promises not to give up while he doesn't manage to kick them out of home and regain control of all his father's fortune to the legal family.
Henrique likes to show his fortune while his brother Duarte looks deep to the land and basic values. He is the true responsible for the wine quality. Having faced a death situation in the past he truly changes his life and ends up falling in love with Joana, one of the medical clinic researchers. 
These two characters will face internal and external struggle. While Duarte goes through a very difficult divorce from Beatriz that manipulates their son in order not to lose her marriage, Joana lives with the shadow of her past happy marriage that ended suddenly when her husband died in a car crash on her birthday. Their love will make us dream along and drives us to believe that strength of feelings will make them win. 
Golden heart is a novella with amazing landscapes of the UNESCO world heritage center of the Douro wine region, focusing on the human condition. The feelings that move us all to the moral limits and beliefs of each of us. What are you willing to do?

Cast

References

2015 Portuguese television series debuts
2016 Portuguese television series endings
Portuguese telenovelas
2015 telenovelas
Sociedade Independente de Comunicação telenovelas
Portuguese-language telenovelas